The men's 110 metres hurdles at the 1950 European Athletics Championships was held in Brussels, Belgium, at Heysel Stadium on 23 and 24 August 1950.

Medalists

Results

Final
24 August
Wind: 0.0 m/s

Heats
23 August

Heat 1
Wind: 0.9 m/s

Heat 2
Wind: 0.6 m/s

Heat 3
Wind: 1.1 m/s

Participation
According to an unofficial count, 15 athletes from 10 countries participated in the event.

 (1)
 (2)
 (1)
 (2)
 (2)
 (1)
 (2)
 (1)
 (1)
 (2)

References

110 metres hurdles
Sprint hurdles at the European Athletics Championships